One Shenzhen Bay is a group of skyscrapers in Shenzhen, Guangdong, China. Construction on tower 7 began in 2014 and the building was completed in 2018.

Gallery

See also

List of tallest buildings in Shenzhen
List of tallest buildings in China

References

Skyscraper office buildings in Shenzhen
Residential skyscrapers in China
Skyscraper hotels in Shenzhen
Skyscrapers in Shenzhen